James Ronald Pardo, Jr. is an American stand-up comedian, actor, and host of the long-running comedy podcast Never Not Funny. From the show's inception until mid-2015, he performed as the Conan O'Brien program Conan's warm-up comedian and cast member, after which he received a general development deal with O'Brien's production company.  He last hosted the game show Race to Escape on the Science Channel.

Early life
Pardo was born in Chicago, Illinois, and spent his first 8 years living on the south side, eventually moving to the south suburbs of Chicago. He spent his grade school years living in Hometown, Illinois. In 1980, his family moved to Oak Forest, Illinois, where he attended Oak Forest High School. In 1986, he moved to Pasadena, California, to attend the American Academy of Dramatic Arts (‘87). He attended for one year, then returned to Chicago to pursue a career in stand-up comedy.

Career
In late 1988, Pardo started performing at open microphones at various venues around Chicago, including "The Roxy", "The Last Laugh" and "The Comedy Cottage". The plethora of successful comedy clubs in the area at that time meant Pardo started earning money almost immediately, allowing him to quit his day job as a sales rep for MCA Records. In addition to his comedy CDs Uno, Pompous Clown and Sprezzatura, in 2007 Pardo appeared on the comedy compilation CD Comedy Death-Ray.

Pardo hosted GSN's National Lampoon's Funny Money from June to October 2003, and later co-hosted AMC's Movies At Our House with Rachel Quaintance for 5 seasons.

Pardo was the warm-up comedian for The Tonight Show with Conan O'Brien after being suggested by head writer Mike Sweeney. He has returned as the opening act for Conan, and appeared in a recurring on-air sketch throughout the week of April 11, 2011. In May 2011 he began conducting backstage interviews with celebrity guests for a web series called "The Pardo Patrol."

After doing live talk and game shows at such Alternative comedy venues as the Upright Citizens Brigade Theater, Jimmy Pardo began the award-winning podcast Never Not Funny at the urging of now-producer Matt Belknap. The show is in its thirty-first season and places Pardo among the founders of podcasting. Pardo has been called a "pioneer" of podcasting. Never Not Funny primarily features fellow comedians in improvised conversations. Many of his guests have gone on to host their own podcasts, including Doug Benson and Paul Gilmartin.

Pardo hosts an annual 12 hour live telethon charity fundraiser for Smile Train, an international children’s charity with a sustainable approach to a single, solvable problem: cleft lip and palate.  To date the annual telethon event has raised over $1.2M USD (4,800 surgeries)

In September 2013, Pardo released a comedy album entitled Sprezzatura.

In 2017, Jimmy Pardo and Matt Belknap launched an additional podcast - Playing Games with Jimmy Pardo 

In 2019, Pardo, Matt Belknap, and videographer Eliot Hochberg began releasing the web series Jimmy's Records and Tapes on YouTube.   Episodes feature Pardo talking about what went on in his life during a particular year while highlighting music and trivia regarding said year.

Personal life
Pardo is married to comedy writer Danielle Koenig, daughter of actor Walter Koenig.
They have one son.

References

External links

Jimmy Pardo's Website
Jimmy Pardo on Twitter 
Interview from June 2008
Jimmy Pardo's "Never Not Funny" Podcast
Meet Jimmy Pardo: Never Not Having Fun on LAist

1966 births
American Academy of Dramatic Arts alumni
American game show hosts
American podcasters
American stand-up comedians
Living people
Male actors from Chicago
People from Cook County, Illinois
Comedians from Illinois
21st-century American male actors
People from Oak Forest, Illinois
20th-century American comedians
21st-century American comedians